Côn Đảo Airport or Côn Sơn Airport  is located on Côn Sơn Island, the largest island of Côn Đảo archipelago off the coast of Bà Rịa–Vũng Tàu province, Vietnam.

Airlines and destinations

Statistics

See also 

 List of airports in Vietnam

References

External links 

Buildings and structures in Bà Rịa-Vũng Tàu province
Airports in Vietnam